Dennis Charles Young  (born 7 August 1947) is an Australian politician and a harm reduction campaigner. He was a Liberal Party member of the Legislative Assembly of Queensland from 1974 to 1977, representing the electorate of Baroona. He has been the national executive director of harm reduction organisation Drug Arm since 1988.

Early life 
Young was born in Brisbane, and was educated at Kelvin Grove State School and Kelvin Grove State High School. He was a police officer before entering politics; he also worked for the Juvenile Aid Bureau for eight years.

Politics 
An active member of the Liberal Party, Young served as chairman of his local branch from 1973 to 1975 and was a member of the party's state executive from 1974 to 1975.

Young was elected to the Legislative Assembly at the 1974 election, winning the formerly safe Labor seat of Baroona amidst the landslide Liberal-National victory that year. The seat had been vacated by retiring former Shadow Treasurer Pat Hanlon. Baroona was merged with the adjacent Brisbane electorate to form the Brisbane Central electorate at the 1977 election, and Brisbane MLA Harold Lowes retired after one term, allowing Young to contest the new seat; however, he was defeated by Labor candidate and former Brisbane MLA Brian Davis.

Later life 
Young returned to his career as a police officer after his election defeat. In 1988, however, he was appointed as the national director of harm reduction organisation Drug Arm. He is frequently cited in the media on drug-related issues in this capacity; his expertise in this area has also seen him serve as president of the Queensland Network of Alcohol and Drug Agencies and as a member of the Australian National Council on Drugs.

He was diagnosed with fatty liver disease in August 2005, which doctors attributed to obesity. He subsequently had a liver transplant in May 2006.

References

1947 births
Liberal Party of Australia members of the Parliament of Queensland
Living people
Members of the Queensland Legislative Assembly
Members of the Order of Australia
People from Brisbane